Geebung may refer to:
 The Geebung Polo Club, a poem by Banjo Paterson
 Geebung, Queensland, a suburb in the City of Brisbane, Queensland, Australia
 Persoonia, a genus of shrubs and small trees in the subfamily Persoonioideae in the large and diverse plant family Proteaceae, commonly known as geebungs and snottygobbles